The Backyard is the second release by the American alternative rock band Miracle Legion, released in 1984 on Rough Trade Records.

Release
Released on both 12" vinyl and cassette, the six song EP The Backyard was recorded at Presence Studios and released under Rough Trade Records in 1984. The songs were composed by Mark Mulcahy and Ray Neal.

The eponymous title track "The Backyard" became a staple on college radio charts following its release, and there was a music video for it which received regular rotation on MTV. The lyrics to "The Backyard" focus on Mulcahy's youth.

A tribute album to Mulcahy, Ciao My Shining Star: The Songs of Mark Mulcahy, was released in 2009 by Shout! Factory and features a cover of "The Backyard" by alternative rock band Dinosaur Jr.

Reception

Drawing comparison to R.E.M., the record received much acclaim. Music critic Robert Christgau writing positively on Mulcahy's lyrics says that they are of "dazzled childhood and yearning adolescence," and likens the vocals to Loudon Wainwright III. The album has been called a "landmark" by Trouser Press, and calls the title track "sheer brilliance."

Track listing

Personnel
Joel Potocsky - bass guitar
Mark Mulcahy - vocals
Jeff Wiederschall - drums
Ray Neal - guitar

References

Notes

Citations

Sources

Online sources

External links

1984 EPs
Miracle Legion albums
Rough Trade Records EPs